Wang Hongfan (1 September 1933 – 3 October 2022) was a Chinese politician. A member of the Communist Party, he served in the National People's Congress from 1993 to 1998.

Wang died in Zhengzhou on 3 October 2022, at the age of 89.

References

1933 births
2022 deaths
Delegates to the 8th National People's Congress
Delegates to the National People's Congress from Henan
Politicians from Xichuan County, Henan